On May 19, 2007, Indonesia launched its own version of Deal or No Deal, called Deal or No Deal Indonesia, hosted by Tantowi Yahya, previously host of that country's version of Who Wants to Be a Millionaire?. The prizes range from as little as Rp500 (US$0.04), to as much as Rp2,000,000,000 (US$167,000). The set and rules of the game are the same as the US version.

On December 1, 2011, season 2 premiered on antv, hosted by Deddy Corbuzier. The top prize was Rp1,000,000,000 (US$83,000).

On October 20, 2014, season 3 premiered on Global TV, hosted by Cak Lontong. The top prize is Rp500,000,000 (US$42,000).

Money Tree

Season 1 (RCTI)

Season 2 (antv)

Season 3 (Global TV) 

Indonesia
Indonesian game shows
2007 Indonesian television series debuts
2008 Indonesian television series endings
2000s Indonesian television series
2010s Indonesian television series
2012 Indonesian television series debuts
2014 Indonesian television series endings
2000s game shows
2010s game shows
RCTI original programming
ANTV original programming
GTV (Indonesian TV network) original programming